Mici Erdélyi (Born Mária Ernesztina Erdélyi; 11 September 1910 – July 1994) was a Hungarian actress.

She was born in Teschen, Austria-Hungary (today split between Cieszyn, Poland and Český Těšín, Czech Republic) and died in Santa Monica, California.

Selected filmography
 Hyppolit, the Butler (1931)
 Emmy (1934)
 Búzavirág (1934)
 Half-Rate Honeymoon (1936)
 Rézi Friday (1938)
 The Hen-Pecked Husband (1938)
 The Minister's Friend (1939)
 Let's Love Each Other (1941)
 Katyi (1942)
 Álomkeringö (1943)
 Jómadár (1943)

External links

1910 births
1994 deaths
Hungarian film actresses
20th-century Hungarian actresses
Hungarian emigrants to the United States
People from Cieszyn
People from Český Těšín